The Lane County Clerk's Building, located in Eugene, Oregon, is listed on the National Register of Historic Places.

See also
 National Register of Historic Places listings in Lane County, Oregon

References

1853 establishments in Oregon Territory
Buildings and structures completed in 1853
Buildings and structures in Eugene, Oregon
Neoclassical architecture in Oregon
County clerks in Oregon
County government agencies in Oregon
County government buildings in Oregon
Lane County, Oregon
National Register of Historic Places in Eugene, Oregon